Limnophila is a genus of flowering plants in the family Plantaginaceae. It is distributed in tropical and subtropical regions of Africa, Asia, Australia, and the Pacific Islands. Species are known commonly as marshweeds.

These are annual or perennial herbs. They grow in wet habitat, such as marshes, and some are aquatic. Some species are glandular and aromatic. Plants of the genus vary in form, from erect to prostrate, and with branching or unbranched stems. Submerged leaves are whorled; aerial leaves are whorled or oppositely arranged. The leaves are lance-shaped or pinnate, and the blades have smooth or serrated edges. Some species have flowers solitary in the leaf axils, and others have flowers in inflorescences. The sepals are arranged in a tubular calyx, and the corolla is tubular or funnel-shaped. The corolla has a lower lip with three lobes and an upper lip that is unlobed or double-lobed.

Cabomba caroliniana, a plant in a different family, is noted for having leaves that resemble those of Limnophila.

Systematics 

There are about 40 species in the genus.

Species include:
Limnophila aquatica
Limnophila aromatica – swampleaf, rice paddy herb
Limnophila bangweolensis 
Limnophila barteri
Limnophila borealis
Limnophila ceratophylloides  
Limnophila chinensis – finger grass
Limnophila connata
Limnophila dasyantha
Limnophila erecta
Limnophila heterophylla 
Limnophila indica – Indian marshweed  
Limnophila repens 
Limnophila rugosa
Limnophila sessiliflora – ambulia  
Limnophila tenera

References 

Plantaginaceae
Plantaginaceae genera